This is a list of hospitals in Vietnam.

Hanoi

Public 

Bach Mai Hospital, largest in Hanoi, famous for its endurance against US bombings during Operation Rolling Thunder, during the Vietnam War.
E Hospital
K Hospital - with three campuses is the largest and most comprehensive cancer hospital in the country
Family Medical Practice Hanoi - 298 I Kim Ma Rd., Ba Dinh Dist., Hanoi
Mai Huong Hospital
Saint Paul Hospital
Thanh Nhan Hospital
Viet Duc Hospital, largest centre of surgery in Vietnam.
Vietnam-Cuba Hospital
Vietnam – Soviet Friendship Hospital
Vietnam National Children's Hospital
Vietnam National Hospital of Endocrinology
Vietnam National Obstetrics and Gynecology Hospital
Vietnam National Hospital of Tuberculosis and Respiratory Diseases 
19-8 Hospital
108 Hospital (or Army Central Hospital 108)
National Hospital of Tuberculosis and Pulmonary
Instude of ophthalmology
Hôpital Français de Hanoi

Private 

 Hung Viet Cancer Hospital
 L'Hôpital Français De Hanoï
 Vinmec Times City International Hospital

Red-river Delta

Hải phòng city 
 Vietnam–Czechoslovakia Friendship Hospital

Quảng Ninh Province 
 Vietnam-Sweden hospital
 Halong City Provincial Hospital
 Bai Chay Hospital

Bắc Ninh Province 
 Bắc Ninh Province Hospital
Bắc Ninh Province Hospital of Eyes
Bắc Ninh Province Hospital of Tuberculosis
Bắc Ninh Province Hospital of Mental
Bắc Ninh Province Leprosy Dermatology Hospital
Bắc Ninh Province Rehabilitation - Sanatorium Hospital
Bắc Ninh Province Hospital of Traditional Medicine
Kinh Bắc Hospital
110 Hospital (or Army Central Hospital 110)

Thái nguyên Province 
 Thai Nguyen Central General Hospital or (Thai Nguyen National General Hospital)
 A Hospital of Thai Nguyen
 C Hospital of Thai Nguyen
 Thai Nguyen Province Hospital of Eyes
 Thai Nguyen Province Hospital of Mental
 Thai Nguyen Province Hospital of Traditional Medicine
 Thai Nguyen Province Hospital of Tuberculosis and Respiratory Diseases
 Army Central Hospital 91
 Gang Thep Hospital of Thai Nguyen
 An Phu Hospital

Central Vietnam 
 Hue City Hospital
 Hue Central Hospital
 Da Nang Hospital
 Tam Tri Da Nang General Hospital
 Family Medical Practice, Danang

Ho Chi Minh City

Public

Administered by Vietnam department of health 
 Cho Ray Hospital, the largest hospital in Ho Chi Minh City
 Thống Nhất hospital
 National hospital of Odontostomatology, Ho Chi Minh city
 University medical center - Hồ Chí Minh city university of Medicines and Pharmacy
 Ho Chi Minh City Institute of Hygiene and Public Health
 Pasteur Institute, Ho Chi Minh city
 Ho Chi Minh city Institute of Malaria - Parasitology - Entomology

Administered by Hồ Chí Minh city department of health 
 115 people's hospital 
 1st Children's hospital 
 2nd Children's hospital 
 An Bình general hospital 
 Bình Dân hospital for surgeon 
 Gia Định people's hospital 
 General hospital of Củ Chi 
 General hospital of Hóc Môn 
 General hospital of Thủ Đức 
 Hồ Chí Minh city children's hospital 
 Hồ Chí Minh city hospital of Blood transfusion and Heamatology 
 Hồ Chí Minh city hospital of Cancer 
 Hồ Chí Minh city hospital of Dermatology and Venereal diseases 
 Hồ Chí Minh city hospital of Ear - nose - throat 
 Hồ Chí Minh city hospital of Odontostomatology 
 Hồ Chí Minh city hospital of Ophthalmology 
 Hồ Chí Minh city hospital of Mental health 
 Hồ Chí Minh city hospital of Rehabilitation and Occupational disease 
 Hồ Chí Minh city hospital of Traditional medicines 
 Hồ Chí Minh city hospital of Trauma and Orthopedics 
 Hồ Chí Minh city hospital of Tropical diseases 
 Hùng Vương hospital of Obstetrics and Gynecology 
 Nhân Ái hospital - Bình Phước province 
 Nguyễn Trãi hospital 
 Nguyễn Tri Phương hospital 
 Phạm Ngọc Thạch hospital of Tuberculogy and Lung Diseases 
 Sài Gòn general hospital 
 Trưng Vương general hospital 
 Từ Dũ hospital of Obstetrics and Gynecology 
 Institute of Traditional medicines 
 Institute of Cardiology 
  
 Center of Leprosy disease 
 Hồ Chí Minh city 115 Emergency center 
 Hồ Chí Minh city International Medical quarantine center 
 Hồ Chí Minh city Preventive health center 
 Hồ Chí Minh city Center for Health Protection of labor and environmental 
 Hồ Chí Minh city Center for Reproductive Health Care 
 Hồ Chí Minh city Center of Forensic 
 1st district hospital and Preventive health center 
 2nd district hospital and Preventive health center 
 3rd district hospital and Preventive health center 
 4th district hospital and Preventive health center 
 5th district hospital and Preventive health center 
 6th district hospital and Preventive health center 
 7th district hospital and Preventive health center 
 8th district hospital and Preventive health center 
 9th district hospital and Preventive health center 
 10th district hospital and Preventive health center 
 11th district hospital and Preventive health center 
 12th district hospital and Preventive health center 
 Bình Tân district hospital and Preventive health center 
 Bình Thạnh district hospital and Preventive health center 
 Gò Vấp district hospital and Preventive health center 
 Phú Nhuận district hospital and Preventive health center 
 Tân Bình district hospital and Preventive health center 
 Tân Phú district hospital and Preventive health center 
 Bình Chánh district hospital and Preventive health center 
 Cần Giờ district hospital and Preventive health center 
 Củ Chi district hospital and Preventive health center 
 Nhà Bè district hospital and Preventive health center 
 Hóc Môn Preventive health center 
 Thủ Đức Preventive health center

Administered by Vietnam Department of Defense 
 175 Central Military Hospital
 7A Military Hospital

Private 
 Cao Thang Eye Hospital (Joint Commission accredited)
 City International Hospital
 Gia Dinh International Hospital
 Family Medical Practice Vietnam
 Gia An 115 Hospital
 Franco-Vietnamese Hospital (Joint Commission accredited)
 Tam Tri Sai Gon General Hospital
 TMMC Cancer Center
 Grace Skincare Clinic

Mekong Delta 
 Can Tho Central Hospital
 An Giang General Hospital
 An Giang Provincial Hospital
 Tam Tri Dong Thap General Hospital
 Kien Giang General Hospital
 Long An General Hospital

External links
 List of hospitals hotline by provinces

Vietnam
 
Hospitals
Vietnam